Aristotelia fruticosa, the mountain wineberry or shrubby wineberry, is a tree-shrub from New Zealand, in the family Elaeocarpaceae. It grows up to 2 m in a densely branching and divaricating form.

References

fruticosa
Trees of New Zealand
Divaricating plants